Events from the year 1990 in Iran.

Incumbents
 Supreme Leader: Ali Khamenei
 President: Akbar Hashemi Rafsanjani 
 Vice President: Hassan Habibi
 Chief Justice: Mahmoud Hashemi Shahroudi

Events
21 June – The 7.4  Manjil–Rudbar earthquake affects northern Iran with a maximum Mercalli intensity of X (Extreme), killing 35,000–50,000, and injuring 60,000–105,000.

Births
22 April – Arsalan Kazemi.
12 November – Farahnaz Amirsoleymani, author and illustrator
23 November – Negin Dadkhah, Iranian national speed skater

Deaths

 15 March – Farzad Bazoft.

See also
 Years in Iraq
 Years in Afghanistan

References

 
Iran
Years of the 20th century in Iran
Iran
1990s in Iran